Subunit may refer to:
Subunit HIV vaccine, a class of HIV vaccine
Protein subunit, a protein molecule that assembles with other protein molecules
Monomer, a molecule that may bind chemically to other molecules to form a polymer
Sub-subunit, a military subunit is a component or subordinate element of a unit (military)
Subunit (format), test reporting and controlling protocol

See also
Unit (disambiguation)